The Lars Geertson House is a historic house located southeast of Salmon in Lemhi County, Idaho. Lars Geertson, a Danish immigrant and cattle rancher, built the house from 1872 to 1883. The two-story log house was built from hewn timbers; the ends were joined by square notches, and the walls were filled in with chinking. In addition to being a rare two-story log house, it is a well-preserved example of typical American log construction methods. Geertson also used his house as the commissary for his ranch, a stagecoach station, and a dance hall.

The house was added to the National Register of Historic Places on April 3, 1980.

References

Houses on the National Register of Historic Places in Idaho
Houses completed in 1872
National Register of Historic Places in Lemhi County, Idaho
Log buildings and structures on the National Register of Historic Places in Idaho